The 1980 United States Senate election in Arizona took place on November 4, 1980. Incumbent Republican Senator Barry Goldwater decided to run for reelection to a third consecutive term, after returning to the Senate in 1968 following his failed presidential run in 1964 against Lyndon B. Johnson. Despite Republican presidential nominee Ronald Reagan's landslide win in Arizona, Goldwater defeated Democratic Party nominee Bill Schulz in the general election by a narrow margin, which later caused Goldwater to decide against running for reelection to a fourth consecutive term. Goldwater won only three counties, including Maricopa County.

Republican primary

Candidates 
 Barry Goldwater, incumbent U.S. Senator

Democratic primary

Candidates 
 Bill Schulz, businessman
 James F. McNulty Jr., state senator
 Frank DePaoli
 Frances Morgan

Results

General election

See also 
 1980 United States Senate elections

References 

1980
Arizona
United States Senate
Barry Goldwater